Michael Grant "Iron Mike" Marshall (January 15, 1943 – May 31, 2021) was an American professional baseball pitcher. He played in Major League Baseball (MLB) in 1967 and from 1969 through 1981 for nine different teams. Marshall won the National League Cy Young Award in 1974 as a Los Angeles Dodger and was a two-time All-Star selection. He was the first relief pitcher to receive the Cy Young Award.

Early life
Marshall was born in Adrian, Michigan, on January 15, 1943. He attended Adrian High School in his hometown, before studying at Michigan State University.  He was signed as an amateur free agent by the Philadelphia Phillies on September 13, 1960.

Career

Marshall did not pitch professionally until 1965 in the minor leagues. Marshall was purchased by the Detroit Tigers in 1966. He made his Major League debut with the Tigers on May 31, 1967, pitching one inning against the Cleveland Indians. He made 37 relief appearances for the Tigers that season, going 1–3 with 10 saves and had a 1.98 earned run average (ERA). But the Tigers sent him back to the minors for 1968, and he was drafted by the Seattle Pilots with the 53rd pick in the 1968 Major League Baseball expansion draft.

The Pilots used Marshall mainly as a starter in his only season there, as he went 3–10 with a 5.13 ERA in 20 games (14 starts). His contract was purchased by the Houston Astros after the season and then traded to the Montreal Expos on June 23, 1970. He began to flourish with Montreal, posting an impressive 1.78 ERA in 1972. Eventually, he led the National League in both saves and games pitched in 1973.

Marshall was traded from the Expos to the Dodgers for Willie Davis at the Winter Meetings on December 5, 1973. He won the National League Cy Young Award in 1974 as a member of the Dodgers, as well as being named the NL Pitcher of the Year by The Sporting News. During the 1974 season, he set a Major League record for most appearances by a relief pitcher, appearing in 106 games. He was a member of the National League All Star Team in 1974 and 1975. Marshall was also named Fireman of the Year by TSN with three different teams: in the NL in 1973 with the Montreal Expos, in 1974 with the Los Angeles Dodgers, and a third time in 1979 in the American League with the Minnesota Twins (sharing the award with Jim Kern). He was voted the Montreal Expos Player of the Year in 1972 and 1973, and was also an original member of the Seattle Pilots.

Marshall, who relied primarily on an elusive screwball, led his league in games pitched four times, saves three times, and games finished five times. He is the holder of two major league records, both of which he set in the 1974 season: most appearances (games pitched) in a season (106), and most consecutive team games with a relief appearance (13). He also holds the  American League record for games pitched in a season with 90 for Minnesota in 1979. In his record-setting 1974 season, he pitched  innings, all of which came in relief appearances. Marshall attended Michigan State University, earning three degrees, including a Doctor of Philosophy in exercise physiology. In the months preceding his 1974 Cy Young season, he considered retiring in order to work on his Ph.D. Marshall pitched for the Dodgers that year.

Personal life 
Marshall earned his Doctor of Philosophy in exercise physiology from Michigan State University in 1978.

Marshall taught and advocated a pitching method he developed that he "believes could completely eradicate pitching-arm injuries." He wanted pitchers to externally rotate early as they swing their arm up. That means the pitcher will lift the hand before the elbow, so that the wrist faces away from the body and up, the hand is above the elbow when the front foot touches the ground, which leads to a smooth transition without a "forearm bounce", as Marshall called it. Marshall believed this causes ulnar collateral ligament injuries, which can necessitate ulnar collateral ligament reconstruction, which is known as "Tommy John surgery". He wanted to first lay back the forearm and then accelerate by rotating the body instead of bending over, in order to protect the elbow against injury.

In September 1982, nearly a year after his final major-league game, Marshall was arrested on charges of disorderly conduct and fourth-degree assault stemming from an incident that had occurred outside Marshall's home in Minnetonka, Minnesota. A community dogcatcher alleged that Marshall had used her truck for target practice after she met with him at his house to discuss a black Labrador dog who she believed was his. The dog catcher, Mary Jo Strand, alleged that Marshall had gone into his garage after the discussion, retrieved a baseball and heaved it at her departing vehicle. The ball allegedly struck the top of Strand's truck, landing about two feet from the driver's window. Marshall denied threatening Strand or throwing the ball at her. He also denied that the dog was his. Instead, he asserted that he twice had asked Strand to leave his property and that if she did not do so, he would consider her to be trespassing and would not be responsible "if something happens to your truck", he told the Associated Press.

Marshall taught the screwball to his cousin, Brent Honeywell Sr., who taught it to his son, Brent Honeywell Jr.

Marshall died on May 31, 2021, at his home in Zephyrhills, Florida. He was 78, and had been receiving hospice care.

See also

 List of Major League Baseball annual saves leaders
 List of Major League Baseball individual streaks

References

External links

 

1943 births
2021 deaths
American expatriate baseball players in Canada
American League saves champions
Atlanta Braves players
Bakersfield Bears players
Baseball players from Michigan
Buffalo Bisons (minor league) players
Chattanooga Lookouts players
Cy Young Award winners
Detroit Tigers players
Dothan Phillies players
Edmonton Trappers players
Eugene Emeralds players
Houston Astros players
Los Angeles Dodgers players
Magic Valley Cowboys players
Michigan State Spartans baseball players
Michigan State University alumni
Minnesota Twins players
Montgomery Rebels players
Montreal Expos players
National League All-Stars
National League saves champions
New York Mets players
Oklahoma City 89ers players
People from Adrian, Michigan
Screwball pitchers
Seattle Pilots players
Texas Rangers players
Toledo Mud Hens players
Winnipeg Whips players